Argyresthia praecocella, the ochreous argent or juniper berry miner moth, is a moth of the  family Yponomeutidae. It is found in most of Europe, except Ireland, Portugal and the Balkan Peninsula. It is also found in Russia and across the Palearctic to Japan.

The wingspan is 9–10 mm.

The larvae feed on Juniperus communis and Juniperus rigida. They feed within the berries of their host plant. The species overwinters as a prepupa.

References

Moths described in 1839
Argyresthia
Moths of Asia
Moths of Europe